Bihpur is a block in Bhagalpur district of Bihar, India. It is one of sixteen blocks under Bhagalpur district.

References

Bhagalpur district